Partitioning defective 6 homolog alpha is a protein that in humans is encoded by the PARD6A gene.

Function 

This gene is a member of the PAR6 family and encodes a protein with a PSD95/Discs-large/ZO1 (PDZ) domain and a semi-Cdc42/Rac interactive binding (CRIB) domain. This cell membrane protein is involved in asymmetrical cell division and cell polarization processes as a member of a multi-protein complex. The protein also has a role in the epithelial-to-mesenchymal transition (EMT) that characterizes the invasive phenotype associated with metastatic carcinomas. Alternate transcriptional splice variants, encoding different isoforms, have been characterized.

A recent study shows that Par6 associates with PKC-ι but not with PKC-zeta in melanoma. Oncogenic PKC-iota can promote melanoma cell invasion by up-regulating PKC-ι/Par6 pathway during EMT. PKC-ι inhibition or knockdown resulted an increase E-cadherin and RhoA levels while decreasing total Vimentin, phophorylated Vimentin (S39) and Par6 in metastatic melanoma cells. These results suggested that PKC-ι is involved in signaling pathways which upregulate EMT in melanoma.

Interactions 

PARD6A has been shown to interact with:
 CDC42, 
 ECT2 
 Protein kinase Mζ, and
 RAC1.
 Protein kinase C-ι.

References

Further reading